Michael Graziadei (born September 22, 1979) is an American actor, known for his role as Daniel Romalotti on the CBS daytime soap opera The Young and the Restless.

Life and career
Graziadei was born in Germany. He returned to the United States at 11 years old.   He began acting in Germany, on stage, at the age of 5 in a production of The King and I. While at The University of New Hampshire he also appeared in The Servant of Two Masters and History of the Devil. In 2004, he was cast as Daniel Romalotti,  Phyllis Summers' son, in the CBS daytime soap opera The Young and the Restless. In 2013 he left from soap for career in primetime television. In 2005 and in 2006, he was nominated for a Daytime Emmy Award for Outstanding Younger Actor in a Drama Series. In film, Graziadei starred in the films Boogeyman 2 (2007), Into the Blue 2: The Reef (2009), and The Outside (2009).

Graziadei guest-starred in a number of television series, including NCIS, Criminal Minds, 90210, Castle, CSI: Crime Scene Investigation, and Agents of S.H.I.E.L.D.. He had a recurring roles on FX's American Horror Story as Travis Wanderley, a young boyfriend of Jessica Lange's character, and on The CW's The Secret Circle. In 2013, after leaving daytime television, Graziadei was cast as a series regular in the ABC drama pilot Westside. The pilot was not picked up for the continuing series. Later, he was cast as the male lead in the Lifetime drama series The Lottery, opposite Marley Shelton. The show was cancelled after one season.

In August 2016, Graziadei reprised his portrayal of Daniel Romalotti on The Young and the Restless for a limited run, in celebration of the soap's 11,000th episode. He also landed recurring roles on the Audience mixed martial arts drama series Kingdom and the Amazon Video historical drama series Good Girls Revolt.

In 2018, Graziadei appeared in episode 3 of the remake of Magnum P.I.; he played Tara's ex-boyfriend and kidnapper in the episode entitled "The Woman Who Never Died", originally airing on October 8, 2018.

Filmography

Film

Television

References

External links
 

1979 births
21st-century American male actors
American male film actors
American people of Italian descent
American people of Lithuanian descent
American male soap opera actors
American male television actors
Living people
Male actors from New Hampshire
People from Nashua, New Hampshire